Amorós or Amoros is a surname. Notable people with the name include:

 Celia Amorós (born 1944), Spanish philosopher, essayist and feminist
 Ciril Amorós (born 1904), Spanish footballer
 Eduardo Amorós (born 1943), Spanish equestrian
 Georgina Amorós (born 1998), Spanish actress
 Grimanesa Amorós (born 1962), Peruvian-American artist
 Juan Amorós (1936–2016), Spanish cinematographer
 Juan Carlos Amorós, Spanish football manager
 Manuel Amoros (born 1962), French former footballer
 Marta Amorós (born 1970), Spanish synchronized swimmer
 Sandy Amorós (1930–1992), Major League Baseball player from Cuba
 Sébastien Amoros (born 1995), French footballer
 Vanesa Amorós (born 1982), Spanish former handball player

See also
 Francisco Amorós y Ondeano (1770–1848), Marquis of Sotelo, promoter of gymnastics
 José Alcoverro y Amorós (1835—1908), Spanish sculptor